Doma menorquina is the traditional style of riding of the island of Menorca. It is closely associated with the Menorquín horse.

Doma menorquina is based on classical dressage and resembles a combination of Haute Ecole (dressage) ("High School") and Doma vaquera disciplines. Usually, stallions 3–4 years old are trained. From the three basic gaits, walk, trot and gallop, training progresses to the Spanish walk, half pass, flying changes and piaffe and culminates in the bot, or walking courbette.

Horses and riders are at the centre of local  celebrations, in a tradition that may go back to the 14th century and incorporate elements of Christian, pagan and Moorish ritual. Some 150 riders participate in the festival of Mare de Déu de Gràcia, the Birth of Mary, in Mahón (September 8–9) and in that of Sant Joan, Saint John, in Ciutadella (23–24 June). Riders pass through the crowds, executing caracoles and repeatedly performing the bot; the more often it is performed and the greater the distance travelled, the greater the applause of the crowd. Touching the horses is believed to bring good luck.

See also 
List of Equestrian Sports

External links 
 Doma Menorquina at Muro, Mallorca, 2010
 Video showing the bot
 TV footage of two ensortillas (at the start and at 1'13")
 Video of córrer abraçats
 Video of the festa of Sant Joan at Ciutadella

References 

Equestrian sports
Sport in Menorca